Ellwood Walter (August 16, 1803 – May 7, 1877) was president of the Mercantile Mutual Insurance Company in New York City for 28 years. The Mercantile Mutual Insurance Company was organized in April 1844. He was also secretary of the New York Board of Marine Underwriters since 1849. He insured Cornelius Vanderbilt and many American Steamship companies during the 19th century.

Early life
Born in Philadelphia, Pennsylvania to a Quaker family. Walter married Deborah Coggeshall on August 9, 1827, in New York City. They had six children: Elizabeth, Thomas, Anna, George, Ellwood Jr., and Sarah Walter. His daughter Sarah married Thomas Burling Hallock (1838–1924) at the Walters' home in Brooklyn Heights. In his early life, he was an editor of a weekly newspaper, The Ariel: A Literary and Critical Gazette, published in his hometown Philadelphia.

Career

In 1827 Walter started and edited a newspaper in Philadelphia which was a weekly.

By 1845 Walter was secretary of the Mercantile Mutual Insurance Company located at 35 Wall Street, New York. In 1847 he became a Vice president of the insurance company, and in 1853 he became its President. Walter had been associated with the Mercantile Mutual Insurance Company for 28 years.

Walter was secretary of the New York Board of Marine Underwriters. In 1845, an unofficial Pilot Commission was established with two representatives from the Marine Underwriters and three from the Chamber of Commerce. Pilot boats working under the Underwriters' Commission took on licensed pilots and proved to be more insurable because of their strict rules and regulations. By 1846, the Underwriters' Commission became the official body for governing the pilot service.

In 1854, when Cornelius Vanderbilt was creating steamships, it was hard to get Marine insurance for the new design. Walter made a visit to Vanderbilt's house.  After their meeting, Vanderbilt put $1,000.000 into the Mercantile Mutual Insurance Company. Once people got word that Walter was insuring the Vanderbilt ships, everyone wanted to insure them.

The New York pilot-boat Ellwood Walter, No. 7 was named after Walter. The ship carried cargo between Boston Massachusetts and New York.

In October 1861, Walter became a trustee of the Nautical School for the harbor of New York. Its purpose was to educate boys in seamanship and navigation. In May 1869, George W. Blunt became a trustee (along with Walter) of the Nautical School for the harbor of New York.

On May 14, 1871, Walter was elected as Vice-President of the New York Seamen's Association. The association was to help provide the "moral, mental, and social improvement of the seamen; to elevate their character and efficiency as a class, and to protect them from impositions and abuses at home and abroad." $20,000 dollars was raised to build a building for the Seamen's Association. The building would contain a reading room and library. In 1876, there was an act to authorize the transfer of the property of the New York Seamen's Association to the American Seamen's Friend Society and to dissolve the New York Seamen's Association.

In 1872, Walter was reported in The Gardener's Monthly and Horticultural Advertiser for having an apple tree that also had fully formed pears. In an apparent "freak of nature", the limbs of one tree intertwined with another creating a branch that had both pears and apples growing on it.

Walter was described as a man of "distinguished presence" and "great personal dignity" who had for his time "considerable wealth". Walter was one of the leading members of the Quaker mercantile community.

Death
On May 7, 1877, at the age of 75, Walter died at his residence in Englewood, New Jersey. He was buried from the Friends meeting house on Schermerhorn street at the Quaker Cemetery in Brooklyn, New York.

His residence near Englewood was put up for sale, which had 28 acres of land and a large house.

Post death
The Mercantile Mutual Insurance company went out of business in 1880.

References

External links
 

1803 births
1877 deaths
Businesspeople from Philadelphia
Insurance underwriters
19th-century Quakers